Athymoris subtrigona is a moth in the family Lecithoceridae. It is endemic to Taiwan.

The wingspan is 16–17 mm. There is a distinct dark brown subbasal fascia on the forewings. The median fascia is large and irregular and the discal patch is mushroom-like, edged with a costal fuscous patch. The postmedial line is yellowish white. The hindwings are pale grey.

References

Athymoris
Moths of Taiwan
Endemic fauna of Taiwan
Moths described in 2000